Of One Blood is a 1944 American race film directed, written by and starring Spencer Williams. The film focuses on two orphaned African American brothers who grow up to become a lawyer and a police officer, and who work together to break up a crime ring run by a miscreant who turns out to be their long-lost oldest brother.

Release, reception, and legacy
Like many race films, all of Williams' works were thought to have been lost.

At the time, films were printed on nitrate film, which is highly flammable and is liable to decompose, and only a few prints of Williams' films were made due to their low budget. However, most of his 1940s films have been rediscovered; many were found in a Tyler, Texas warehouse by film historian G. William Jones in 1983, alongside a number of independent exploitation films and prints of popular Hollywood films from the 1930s and 40s. Williams' works recovered in the collection were restored and now held at Southern Methodist University (SMU) as the Tyler, Texas, Black Film Collection.

Of One Blood was one of few films of Williams' not found in the Collection. However, a copy has been preserved in a different SMU collection, and another at the Library of Congress.

See also
 List of films in the public domain in the United States

Footnotes

References

Bibliography

External links 
 

1944 films
American black-and-white films
Films directed by Spencer Williams
Race films
Films about Christianity
American drama films
1944 drama films
1940s English-language films
1940s American films